Flipped Off is an American reality television series on A&E that debuted April 28, 2012.  The series features four-time Survivor contestant Russell Hantz, his brother Shawn Hantz, and real-estate agent Kristen Bredehoeft as they "flip" properties around the Houston area in an attempt to make a profit.

Episodes

References

2010s American reality television series
2012 American television series debuts
2012 American television series endings
English-language television shows
Television shows set in Houston
A&E (TV network) original programming